Rød is a Norwegian word for the color red and a common Norwegian surname. It may refer to
Harald Rød (1907–1982), Norwegian farmer and politician
Henrik Rød (born 1975), Norwegian politician
Ingolf Rød (1889–1963), Norwegian sailor
Knut Rød (1900–1986), Norwegian police officer
Ørnulf Rød (1891–1969), Norwegian barrister
Ragnhild Rød (fl. 1884–1945), Norwegian politician
Terje Rød-Larsen (born 1947), Norwegian diplomat, politician and sociologist

See also
Rød (disambiguation)
Rod (surname)

Surnames from nicknames